Hepsidera is a genus of moths of the family Erebidae. The genus was erected by Charles Swinhoe in 1902.

Afromoths and Butterflies and Moths of the World give this name as a synonym of Alelimma Hampson, 1895.

Species
Hepsidera deletaria (Hampson, 1895) Sikkim
Hepsidera ferruginea Holloway, 2008 Borneo, Peninsular Malaysia, Sumatra
Hepsidera lignea C. Swinhoe, 1902 Peninsular Malaysia, Sumatra, Borneo

References

Hypeninae